An Evening with the Allman Brothers Band: First Set is the thirteenth album by the rock group the Allman Brothers Band.  It was recorded live in December 1991 and March 1992, and released in 1992.

An Evening with the Allman Brothers Band: First Set was the first live Allman Brothers Band album, and their third album overall, to feature Warren Haynes on guitar and Allen Woody on bass.  Haynes and Woody had joined the group when it reformed in 1989.

Track listing
"End of the Line" (Gregg Allman, Warren Haynes, Allen Woody, John Jaworowicz) – 5:43
"Blue Sky" (Dickey Betts) – 8:39
"Get On with Your Life" (Gregg Allman) – 7:58
"Southbound" (Dickey Betts) – 7:52
"Midnight Blues" (Blind Willie McTell, Dickey Betts) – 5:14
"Melissa" (Gregg Allman) – 5:28
"Nobody Knows" (Dickey Betts) – 15:37
"Dreams" (Gregg Allman) – 11:36
"Revival" (Dickey Betts) – 5:56

Personnel

The Allman Brothers Band
Gregg Allman – Hammond B-3 organ, piano, acoustic guitar, lead vocals
Dickey Betts – lead and rhythm guitar, acoustic & acoustic slide guitar, lead vocals
Jaimoe – drums, background vocals
Butch Trucks – drums, tympani, background vocals
Warren Haynes – lead, rhythm, and slide guitar, acoustic guitar, background vocals
Allen Woody – bass, 5 string fretless bass, 18 string bass, acoustic bass, background vocals
Marc Quinones – congas, percussion

Additional musicians
Thom Doucette – harmonica

Production
Produced by Tom Dowd
Recorded and mixed by Jay Mark
Chief engineer: David Hewitt
Engineers: Phil Gitomer, Dave Roberts
Remote Recording Services "Silver Truck"
Second engineer: Andy Roshberg
Mastered by Bob Ludwig
Digital editing: Scott Hull

Recording dates
December 28 – 31, 1991 – Macon City Auditorium, Macon, Georgia
March 3 – 4, 1992 – Orpheum Theatre, Boston, Massachusetts
March 10 – 11, 1992 – Beacon Theatre, New York, New York

See also
An Evening with the Allman Brothers Band: 2nd Set

References

Albums produced by Tom Dowd
1992 live albums
Epic Records live albums
The Allman Brothers Band live albums